Asilomar Conference Grounds is a conference center built for the Young Women's Christian Association (YWCA). It is located east of what was known as Moss Beach on the western tip of the Monterey Peninsula in Pacific Grove, California. Between 1913 and 1929 architect Julia Morgan designed and built 16 of the buildings on the property, of which 11 are still standing. In 1956 it became part of the State Division of Beaches and Parks of California's Department of Natural Resources, and Moss Beach was renamed Asilomar State Beach. Asilomar is a derivation of the Spanish phrase asilo al mar, meaning asylum or refuge by the sea. It is the native homeland of the Rumsen Ohlone people.

History
The annual conference of the YWCA of the Pacific Coast had been held at the Capitola, California hotel through 1911.  Probably because they had outgrown the space, and because the YWCA had a goal of purchasing grounds, Phoebe Apperson Hearst hosted the 1912 conference at her Hacienda in Pleasanton, California, with all proceeds of that year's conference going toward the purchase of a permanent home.  A resulting YWCA committee persuaded the Pacific Improvement Company of Pacific Grove, California to deed  to the YWCA in 1912.  In early 1913 the YWCA announced that Julia Morgan, already at work on the Oakland YWCA building, would design the campgrounds.  Construction began in the spring of 1913 and in August 1913 the Social Hall and the lodging Longhouses opened with nearly 300 girls in attendance.  Merrill Hall, the last of Morgan's designs for Asilomar, was dedicated in 1928.

Several other prominent California women including Ellen Browning Scripps, Mrs. Warren Olney Jr. and Mary Sroufe Merrill were involved in the creation of the retreat.

The winning entry in the naming contest was by Helen Salisbury, a Stanford student.  Her entry created a portmanteau from two Spanish words: Asilo and Mar.

The State of California acquired Asilomar in 1956. John Carl Warnecke designed 7 new buildings to expand the grounds.

Asilomar was declared a National Historic Landmark in 1987 for its role in women's recreation, the development of the YWCA, and the resort nature of nearby Monterey, California.

Today
The property is officially named "Asilomar State Beach and Conference Grounds", and is owned by California State Parks. It is currently used primarily as a conference center for hire but is also open to individual lodging guests and is frequently used for family reunions and other social events.  The grounds are open to the public.  From 1956 until 1994 several non-profit corporations managed the conference grounds in cooperation with California State Parks. Delaware North Companies Parks and Resorts operated the park from 1997 to 2007 under a concessionaire agreement. Aramark won a new 20-year operating contract in January 2009 and began operations there in September of that year.

To preserve the rustic atmosphere of the resort, there are no telephones or televisions in any of the rooms. However, Wi-Fi has recently been installed throughout the property.

In October, 2012 construction began to improve Asilomar's accessibility under Americans with Disabilities Guidelines.  This includes replacement of several old, worn, and rugged asphalt pathways and the construction of new paths made of brick pavers.  Construction work continued into 2014 and included modifications to improve interior access to several rooms as well as the exterior improvements.

Notable conferences
 1972 Experimental Nuclear Magnetic Resonance Conference]]
 1975: Asilomar Conference on Recombinant DNA 
 1994: Critical Assessment of Techniques for Protein Structure Prediction (inaugural meeting)
 2010: Asilomar International Conference on Climate Intervention Technologies
 1969–2012: West Coast Number Theory
 2014: International Commission on the History of Geological Sciences
 2017: Asilomar Conference on Beneficial AI

In popular culture
Wayne Dyer's movie, The Shift (2009) was shot at Asilomar State Beach and at the Asilomar Conference Grounds.

The 1975 Asilomar Conference has been featured in the PBS documentary The Gene: An Intimate History.

References

External links

Official Asilomar website

1913 establishments in California
American Craftsman architecture in California
Arts and Crafts architecture in California
Buildings and structures in Monterey County, California
Event venues on the National Register of Historic Places in California
History of Monterey County, California
Infrastructure completed in 1913
National Historic Landmarks in California
Historic districts in California
National Register of Historic Places in Monterey County, California
Pacific Grove, California
Tourist attractions in Monterey County, California
YWCA buildings
Women in California